Lea Schwer (born 13 January 1982 in Basel) is a Swiss beach volleyball player.

About a week before the 2008 Summer Olympics in Beijing, China, the Austrian team Montagnolli - Swoboda, pulled out of the competition, because of medical reasons. Schwer and her team mate Simone Kuhn, replaced them, and competed at the 2008 Olympic beach volleyball tournament.

Sponsors
Swatch

References

External links
 
 
 
 Official website of team Kuhn - Schwer

1982 births
Living people
Beach volleyball players at the 2008 Summer Olympics
Swiss beach volleyball players
Olympic beach volleyball players of Switzerland
Sportspeople from Basel-Stadt